A Merca is a municipality in Ourense in the Galicia region of north-west Spain. It is located in the western central part of the province.

References  

Municipalities in the Province of Ourense